Shahrak-e Shohada Ashayir (also Romanized as Shahrak-e Shohadā’ ‘Ashāyīr; also known as Shahrak-e Shohadā) is a village in Qaleh Biyaban Rural District, in the Central District of Darab County, Fars Province, Iran. At the 2006 census, its population was 410, in 97 families.

References 

Populated places in Darab County